Lakhdar Ben Cherif (1899-1967) was a popular Algerian poet. Many of his poems were later released as popular songs, including by the  Algerian singer Abdallah Menai. Ben Cherif's mother was of Turkish origin.

References

1899 births
1967 deaths
Algerian people of Turkish descent
20th-century Algerian poets
Algerian male poets
20th-century male writers